The 2023 Campeonato Alagoano (officially the Série A Alagoano 1XBET 2023 for sponsorship reasons) is the 93rd edition of the top football league in Alagoas organized by FAF. It began on 14 January and will end on 8 April 2023. CRB are the defending champions.

Format
In the first stage, each team will play the other seven teams in a single round-robin tournament. Top four teams will advance to the semi-finals, while the bottom team will be relegated to the 2024 Campeonato Alagoano Série B. Semi-finals and finals will be played on a home-and-away two-legged basis with the best overall performance team hosting the second leg. If tied on aggregate, the penalty shoot-out will be used to determine the winners.

Champions will qualify for the 2024 Copa do Brasil and 2024 Copa do Nordeste, while runners-up will qualify for the 2024 Copa do Brasil. 2023 Campeonato Alagoano third place and 2023 Copa Alagoas champions will play a two-legged play-off to determine the third team qualified for the 2024 Copa do Brasil. If tied on aggregate, the penalty shoot-out will be used to determine the winners. Best team not already qualified for 2024 Série A, Série B or Série C will qualify for 2024 Campeonato Brasileiro Série D.

Teams

First stage

Final stage

Bracket

Semi-finals

|}

Matches

CRB qualified for 2024 Copa do Brasil

ASA qualified for 2024 Copa do Brasil

Finals

Winners qualify for 2024 Copa do Nordeste

2023 Copa do Brasil play-off

Winners qualify for 2024 Copa do Brasil

References

Campeonato Alagoano
Alagoano
2023 in Brazilian football